Stephenville Crossing (2021 population: 1,634) is a town in the Canadian province of Newfoundland and Labrador. It is on the island of Newfoundland at the easternmost limit of Bay St. George.

History 
The settlement derives its name from the Newfoundland Railway, which ran through the community on its way from Port aux Basques to Corner Brook.

The Hanson Memorial Highway was constructed by the United States Army Air Forces (USAAF) to link the railway line at Stephenville Crossing with Harmon Field, which was under construction on the other side of a hill to the north, in Stephenville. Later, the USAAF built its own railway line from Stephenville Crossing to Stephenville.

Since the air base was constructed, Stephenville Crossing has functioned more or less as a suburb of Stephenville but there is a ten-minute car drive between both towns.

The 1988 abandonment of the railway in Newfoundland by CN resulted in the last train running through Stephenville Crossing to St. George's (return) on June 6, 1990.

Geography 
Stephenville Crossing is on the west coast of the island of Newfoundland within Division No. 4. It is part of an area referred to as Bay St. George.

Demographics 

Attractions 
Stephenville Crossing has amenities such as a four-pump gas station, a federal post office, two pharmacies, a grocery store, a convenience store, two building supplies stores, a volunteer fire department, a K-8 elementary school (including a pre-school program), and a bar.

It also has a medical clinic with a family doctor, a government ran long term care home and a search and rescue unit. The Barachois Search and Rescue is active in assisting authorities in water rescues and finding missing persons.

The government-ran long-term care centre called The Bay St.George Long-Term Care Centre opened in 1976 (expanded in the late 1980s), with 114 beds offering complete and total care to residents living with diminished capabilities.

Education 
St. Michael's Elementary School is a K-8 school off West Street that educates around 150 pupils. Facilities include a science lab, an art room, a music room, a gymnasium, and a cafeteria. It was officially opened in December 1976.

See also 
List of communities in Newfoundland and Labrador
List of designated places in Newfoundland and Labrador

References 

Designated places in Newfoundland and Labrador
Towns in Newfoundland and Labrador